Chillicothe was a Amtrak stop in Chillicothe, Illinois; a suburb of Peoria. The station was a stop on the Southwest Chief between Chicago Union Station and Los Angeles Union Station before the alignment was changed to go via Burlington Northern Santa Fe's Mendota Subdivision in 1996.

Amtrak service at Chillicothe began on May 1, 1971 with the Chicago-Houston Texas Chief, a service previously run by the Atchison, Topeka and Santa Fe Railway. This route was renamed the Lone Star in 1974 and discontinued in 1979.

For most of Amtrak's first quarter-century, it was Peoria's only link to the national rail system. The short-lived Prairie Marksman ran to East Peoria in 1980 and 1981.

The station site, Streator and the Galesburg station are currently served by BNSF on their Chillicothe Subdivision.

References

External links 
Trainweb.org – Chillicothe, IL (CIA)
BNSF Subdivision Map

Former Amtrak stations in Illinois
Former Atchison, Topeka and Santa Fe Railway stations
Railway stations closed in 1996
Transportation buildings and structures in Peoria County, Illinois